The Bush Fire was a human-caused wildfire that started in the Tonto National Forest northeast of Phoenix, Arizona. It burned . The fire started on June 13, 2020 near the intersection of Bush Highway and SR 87 and was fully contained on July 6, 2020

Events 

By the morning of June 17, 2020, the fire had burned more than 89,059 (36,041 ha) acres with 5% containment.

By the morning of June 18, 2020, the fire had burned around 25,882 acres since the previous morning. The burned area has grown to 114,941 while containment remained at 5%.

On July 6, 2020 the fire was fully contained.

Impact
On June 15, 2020, the Gila County Sheriff's Office began issuing evacuation orders for nearby residents with the Maricopa County Sheriff's Office issuing orders the following day.

Multiple highways were closed due to the fire.

Gallery

References

Wildfires in Arizona
2020 Arizona wildfires
Tonto National Forest
Wildfires in Maricopa County, Arizona